Smokowski (feminine Smokowska) is a Polish surname. Notable people with the surname include:

 Tomasz Smokowski (born 1973), Polish journalist
 Wincenty Smokowski (1797–1876), Polish-Lithuanian painter

See also
 Srokowski

Polish-language surnames